Arlette Langmann (born 3 April 1946) is a French screenwriter, film editor and production designer.  Born in Paris to Jewish immigrant parents from Romania and Poland,  Langmann is best known for her long-running collaborations with her brother Claude Berri, Maurice Pialat, and Philippe Garrel.

Filmography
 Naked Childhood (1968) co-writer
 Le poème de l'élève Mikovsky (1971) editor
 La maison des bois (1971) editor, TV Mini-series 
 We Won't Grow Old Together (1972) editor
 The Mouth Agape (1974) editor
 Un coup de rasoir (1977) editor
 Graduate First (1978) editor
 La fabrique, un conte de Noël (1979) editor
 Loulou (1980) co-writer
 Je Vous Aime (1980) editor
 Le maître d'école (1981) editor
 À Nos Amours (1983) co-writer, production designer
 Madman at War (1985) co-writer
 Jean de Florette (1986) editor
 La Fille de quinze ans (1989) co-writer
 Chimère (1989) co-writer
 Uranus (1990) co-writer
 Jour de colère (1992) co-writer
 Nous deux (1992) co-writer
 Germinal (1993) co-writer
 Les amoureux (1994) co-writer
 Circuit Carole (1995) co-writer
 Les victimes (1996) co-writer
 Le Vent de la nuit (1999) co-writer
 La débandade (1999) co-writer
 Sauvage innocence (2001) co-writer
 Regular Lovers (2005) co-writer
 Frontier of the Dawn (2008) co-writer
 Jealousy (2013) co-writer
 In the Shadow of Women (2015) co-writer
 Lover for a Day (2017) co-writer
 Le sel des larmes (2019) co-writer
 The Plough (2023), co-writer

References

External links
 

1946 births
Living people
French film editors
French screenwriters
Film people from Paris
20th-century French Jews
French women film editors